Minneapolis station may refer to:

Target Field station, a multimodal train station in Minneapolis
Minneapolis–Saint Paul Joint Air Reserve Station, a United States Air Force base at Minneapolis–Saint Paul International Airport
Chicago, Milwaukee, St. Paul and Pacific Depot Freight House and Train Shed, a historic train station in Minneapolis
Minneapolis Great Northern Depot, a historic train station in Minneapolis, demolished in 1978

See also
Saint Paul Union Depot, the main train station in Saint Paul, Minnesota
List of Metro (Minnesota) light rail stations